The Mark may refer to:

Buildings
The Mark (Bucharest), future class-A office building in Bucharest, Romania
The Mark (New York), a hotel in New York
The Mark (San Diego), a building in San Diego, California
The Mark (Seattle), an office-hotel skyscraper under construction in Seattle, Washington
The Mark (Sydney), a residential tower in Central Park, Sydney, Australia
Mark Hopkins Hotel, a hotel in San Francisco

Popular culture
Number of the beast (often referred to as the mark), a mysterious concept in the Book of Revelation
The Mark (novel), a 2000 novel in the Left Behind series by Tim LaHaye
The Mark (1961 film), a 1961 film directed by Guy Green
The Mark (2012 film), a 2012 film directed by James Chankin
"The Mark", a song by Black Light Burns
Rohan (Middle-earth) (also referred to as the Mark), a fictional country in J.R.R. Tolkien's Middle-earth legendarium
"The Mark", a campaign and web site by Grolsch

See also
 Mark (disambiguation)